The Roseben Handicap was an American Thoroughbred horse race run annually from 1940 through 1995. Hosted by Belmont Park in Elmont, New York, it was open to horses age three and older. A Grade III event at the time of its cancellation, it was contested on dirt over a distance of six furlongs.

Inaugurated in 1940, it was named in honor of U.S. Racing Hall of Fame inductee, Roseben. The race was run at Aqueduct Racetrack from 1962 through 1982. During its tenure, it was contested at two distances:
 6 F : 1940-1953, 1981-1995
 7 F : 1954-1980

The 1977 race had to be canceled as a result of a strike action by unionized racetrack employees.

Records
Speed record:
at 6 furlongs:
 1:08.20 Up Beat (1949)
 1:08.20 For Really (1991)
at 7 furlongs:
 1:21.00 Lord Rebeau (1976)

Winners
1995 - Evil Bear
1994 - Boundary
1993 - Codys Key
1992 - Drummond Lane
1991 - For Really
1990 - Mr. Nickerson
1989 - Pok Ta Pok
1988 - High Brite
1987 - Groovy
1986 - I Am the Game
1985 - Hagley's Reward
1984 - Top Avenger
1983 - Swelegant
1982 - Gratification
1981 - Ring of Light
1980 - Dave's Friend
1979 - Nice Catch
1978 - Big John Taylor
1977 - No race
1976 - Lord Rebeau
1975 - Step Nicely
1974 - Torsion
1971 - Native Royalty
1970 - Reviewer
1969 - Terrible Tiger
1968 - Dr. Fager
1967 - Indulto
1966 - Bold Lad
1965 - National
1964 - Bonjour
1963 - George Barton
1962 - Rose Net
1958 - Red God
1957 - War Piper
1956 - First Aid
1955 - Red Hannigan
1954 - White Skies
1953 - Squared Away
1952 - Dark Peter
1951 - Delegate
1950 - Olympia
1949 - Up Beat
1948 - Rippey
1947 - Inroc
1946 - Polynesian
1945 - Salto
1944 - Cassis
1943 - Some Chance
1942 - Some Chance
1941 - Harvard Square
1940 - The Chief

References
 1946 Roseben Handicap results at the New York Times
 Dr. Fager's win in the 1968 Roseben Handicap
 May 28, 1995 New York Daily News report on the 1995 Roseben Handicap

External links
 The Roseben Handicap at Pedigree Query

Discontinued horse races in New York (state)
Graded stakes races in the United States
Recurring sporting events established in 1940
Recurring sporting events disestablished in 1995
1940 establishments in New York (state)
1995 disestablishments in New York (state)